The 2008 Asian Tour was the 14th season of the modern Asian Tour, the main men's professional golf tour in Asia excluding Japan, since it was established in 1995. Prize money for the season exceeded US$43 million and Jeev Milkha Singh topped the Order of Merit for the second time with a record US$1,452,702.

Schedule
The following table lists official events during the 2008 season.

Order of Merit
The Order of Merit was titled as the UBS Order of Merit and was based on prize money won during the season, calculated in U.S. dollars.

Awards

Notes

References

External links
The Asian Tour's official English language site

Asian Tour
Asian Tour